Eric Selbin is a political sociologist whose primary research interests are revolutions and related forms of collective behavior (resistance, rebellion, social movements) as well as international relations theory. Much of his work has focused on Latin America and the Caribbean, and his volume on modern Latin American revolutions is frequently used as a textbook in courses in Latin American studies and contentious politics. He holds a PhD from the University of Minnesota and is professor of political science at Southwestern University in Georgetown, Texas, where he has also been appointed a university scholar. In 2013, Selbin was appointed a research fellow at the Teresa Lozano Long Institute of Latin American Studies at the University of Texas at Austin and he has held appointments at Sweden’s Umeå University (2003-2006) and at the Tallinn Postgraduate Summer School in Social and Cultural Studies (2012). In 2014, he was appointed to the Lucy King Brown chair, one of six endowed Brown chairs at Southwestern University.

Selbin's most well-known work is Revolution, Rebellion, Resistance: The Power of Story (2010), which puts forth four different types of "revolutionary story" that have accompanied revolutionary struggles from the French Revolution to the present day: civilizing and democratizing, the social revolution, freedom and liberation, and the lost and forgotten. For Selbin, these narratives, conducted across time and space through processes of myth, memory and mimesis, are the crucible of revolutionary action.

Selbin has also collaborated on topics related to homeschooling and feminism with Helen Cordes, the writer and editor to whom he is married, and their two daughters.

Selected publications
Revolution, Rebellion, and Resistance: The Power of Story (2010), Zed Books. Revolution, Rebellion, and Resistance: The Power of Story (2010). Published in German as Gerücht und Revolution: Von der Macht des Weitererzählens (WBG, 2010), in India (Books for Change, 2011), in Spanish as El Poder del Relato: Revolución, rebelión y Resistencia (Interzona Editoria, 2012), in Arabic as ثورة تمرد المقاومة: قوة قصة (NCT, 2013), and forthcoming in Turkish (Abis Yayinlari, 2014).
Decentering International Relations (2010), co-authored with Meghana Nayak, Zed Books.
Modern Latin American Revolutions (1993), Westview.

References

External links 
 Faculty page at Southwestern University Department of Political Science.
 Interview with Eric Selbin on human rights in Latin America in the wake of Operation Condor, by Chilam Balam Films.
 Eric Selbin: The Revolution Will Be Televised, from Tallinn Summer School, Tallinn University.

Living people
University of Minnesota alumni
Political sociologists
Year of birth missing (living people)
Revolution theorists